Statue of Kanō Jigorō, Tokyo may refer to:

 Statue of Kanō Jigorō, Bunkyō
 Statue of Kanō Jigorō, Shinjuku